Most Precious Blood Roman Catholic Church, Rectory and Parochial School is a historic Roman Catholic Church complex located at 2800–2818 Diamond Street in the Strawberry Mansion neighborhood of Philadelphia, Pennsylvania.  The school was built between 1908 and 1912, the rectory in 1914, and the church between 1924 and 1927.

It was added to the National Register of Historic Places in 1992.

References

Churches on the National Register of Historic Places in Pennsylvania
Roman Catholic churches completed in 1908
Roman Catholic churches in Philadelphia
Roman Catholic churches in Pennsylvania
Strawberry Mansion, Philadelphia
National Register of Historic Places in Philadelphia
1912 establishments in Pennsylvania
20th-century Roman Catholic church buildings in the United States